Malawi and Zimbabwe have had a close history for a long time. They share common values, history and culture.
Along with Zambia, they were one country under the Federation of Rhodesia and Nyasaland. Malawi has a large Zimbabwean diaspora and Zimbabwe has a large Malawian diaspora.

Malawi–Zimbabwe Joint Permanent Commission of Cooperation (JPCC)

Malawi and Zimbabwe have a  Joint Permanent Commission of Cooperation (JPCC) that has met for the past nine years.

Maize debt

Malawi sold $20 million worth of Zimbabwean borrowed money to purchase maize from Malawi under the Bingu wa Mutharika administration in 2011, that was not repaid.

Land reform

When Malawi assumed the chair of the Southern African Development Community (SADC) in 2001, Muluzi took an active role in SADC on issues such as land reform in Zimbabwe.

See also

 Foreign relations of Malawi
 Foreign relations of Zimbabwe

References

 
Zimbabwe
Bilateral relations of Zimbabwe
Zimbabwe
Zimbabwe and the Commonwealth of Nations